Alban Bizhyti (born 8 March 1984) is an Albanian professional footballer who plays as a midfielder for Albanian club Shkumbini Peqin in the Albanian Second Division.

Club career
Bizhyti is a product of Lushnja academy; he made his professional debut on 13 April 2002 in a league match against Flamurtari Vlorë, scoring a goal only nine minute after coming on as a substitute.

On 22 May 2018, Bizhyti announced that he will retire following end of the 2017–18 season.

International career
Bizhyti has represented Albania at under-19 and -21 levels, making his debut for under-19 squad in 2002 in the first qualifying round of 2003 UEFA European Under-19 Championship.

Honours
Lushnja
Albanian First Division: 2012–13

References

1984 births
Living people
Sportspeople from Lushnjë
Albanian footballers
Association football midfielders
Albania youth international footballers
Albania under-21 international footballers
KS Lushnja players
KS Shkumbini Peqin players
Kategoria e Parë players
Kategoria Superiore players